This is the list of the highest-certified music artists in the United States based on certifications of albums and digital singles (but not physical singles) by the Recording Industry Association of America (RIAA). RIAA certifications are based on wholesale shipments rather than retail sales. Since 2016, the RIAA album certification has also included on-demand audio/video streams (1,500 streams = 1 album unit) and track sale equivalent (10 track sales = 1 album unit). Additionally, awards are only presented if and when a record company applies for certification. Therefore, the total certified units for a given artist may be incomplete or out of date.

The RIAA began its certifications in 1958, therefore, popular artists from earlier eras are generally not represented on this list. , The Beatles have the highest total certified albums and Drake has the highest total certified digital singles. Michael Jackson, Mariah Carey, Eminem, and Taylor Swift are the only acts in the top 30 of both lists.

Top 100 certified music artists (albums)

Notes:
 Deceased
 Disbanded

Top 50 certified music artists (digital singles)

Notes:
 Deceased
 Disbanded

See also

List of best-selling music artists
List of best-selling albums in the United States
List of best-selling singles in the United States

References

External links
 RIAA Website
 Detailed List of Artists with Most Album Certification Units
 Search RIAA Gold and Platinum Database

American music-related lists
Recording Industry Association of America
American music industry
Music recording certifications